Sepaicutea fisheri is a species of beetle in the family Cerambycidae. It was described by Lane in 1972.

References

Oemini
Beetles described in 1972